William Jenkinson (born 1883) was an English footballer who played in the Football League for Gainsborough Trinity.

References

1883 births
Year of death unknown
English footballers
Association football midfielders
English Football League players
Wombwell Town F.C. (1890s) players
Gainsborough Trinity F.C. players